A Woman's Vengeance is a 1948 American film noir drama mystery film directed by Zoltán Korda and starring Charles Boyer, Ann Blyth, Jessica Tandy, Cedric Hardwicke, Rachel Kempson, and Mildred Natwick. The screenplay by Aldous Huxley was based on his 1922 short story "The Gioconda Smile". The film was released by Universal-International.

Plot
Henry Maurier rebounds from the death of wife Emily by marrying a much younger woman, Doris, upsetting another woman, Janet, who is in love with him. Suspicions grow that Henry might have hurried along his wife's death with poison, until eventually he finds himself condemned to death for a murder he didn't commit.

Cast

 Charles Boyer as Henry Maurier
 Ann Blyth as Doris Mead
 Jessica Tandy as Janet Spence
 Cedric Hardwicke as Dr. James Libbard
 Mildred Natwick as Nurse Caroline Braddock
 Cecil Humphreys as General Spence
 Hugh French as Robert Lester
 Rachel Kempson as Emily Maurier
 Valerie Cardew as Clara 
 Carl Harbord as Leslie Blake
 John Williams as Prosecuting Counsel
 Leyland Hodgson as First Warder
 Ola Lorraine as Malsey
 Harry Cording as Chauffeur McNabb

Radio adaptation 
A Woman's Vengeance was presented on Lux Radio Theatre March 22, 1948. Boyer and Blyth reprised their original roles in the adaptation.

References

External links
 
 
 
 

1948 films
Universal Pictures films
1940s mystery drama films
American mystery drama films
American black-and-white films
Films based on works by Aldous Huxley
Films with screenplays by Aldous Huxley
Films scored by Miklós Rózsa
Films directed by Zoltán Korda
Films set in England
Films set in the 1930s
1948 drama films
1940s English-language films
1940s American films